Miroslav Tetter (3 April 1938 – 11 August 2021) was a Czech politician and academic. He was a representative of the South Bohemian Region from 2000 to 2008 and Mayor of České Budějovice from 1998 to 2006 and again in 2010. In his earlier political career he served in the České Budějovice City Council.

Biography
Tetter was born in Vsetín. Tetter also graduated from the Czech University of Life Sciences Prague. He taught at the agricultural school in České Budějovice.

In 1990, Tetter was elected to the České Budějovice City Council as a member of the Club of Committed Non-Party Members (KAN). In 1994, he was re-elected as part of the coalition between KDU-ČSL, KAN, and the Christian Democratic Party (KDS). He was re-elected in 1998, 2002, and 2006, before being defeated in 2010. Tetter served as Mayor of the city from 1998 to 2006. He was elected Mayor of České Budějovice again in 2010, serving from 24 June to 23 November.

In the 2000 regional election, Tetter was elected to the South Bohemian Regional Council as part of the Four-Coalition. He was re-elected in 2004, returning the highest number of votes from any candidate on the list.

Tetter died in České Budějovice on 11 August 2021 at the age of 83.

References

1938 births
2021 deaths
Czech politicians
KDU-ČSL politicians
Mayors of places in the Czech Republic
Masaryk University alumni
Czech University of Life Sciences Prague alumni
Academic staff of the University of South Bohemia
People from Vsetín
People from České Budějovice